Valentín Sergio Pachón Mosquero (born 5 February 1977) is a Spanish retired footballer who played as a striker.

Club career
Born in Madrid, Pachón started his career in the fifth division of Spanish football, playing the following season in the fourth level. He then spent a couple of years with CD Leganés also in his native region, being instrumental as the team managed to consecutively retain their division two status.

In the summer of 2000, Pachón moved to La Liga, being irregularly used at Real Valladolid (31 games in his first year and 24 in the 2002–03 campaign, but only seven in the other two seasons combined). He was released in January 2004 and returned to the capital, now with Getafe CF, again proving an essential offensive unit in the club's first ever promotion to the top division; on 19 June, he scored all five goals in the decisive 5–3 away win against CD Tenerife, being mainly used as a substitute in the following three seasons and also helping the side to the 2007 final of the Copa del Rey.

Pachón stayed in the community subsequently, helping Rayo Vallecano to a level three promotion in his first season. He finished the following year with nine goals – second-best in the squad – as the team overachieved for a final fifth place.

References

External links

1977 births
Living people
Footballers from Madrid
Spanish footballers
Association football forwards
La Liga players
Segunda División players
Segunda División B players
Tercera División players
CD Leganés B players
CD Leganés players
Real Valladolid players
Getafe CF footballers
Rayo Vallecano players
Cádiz CF players
CF Fuenlabrada footballers